Lady Dada was a Philippine comedy-drama miniseries aired on TV5. This was the first starring role of Ryan Agoncillo on the station, although he made his popularity as the host for the network's talent show, Talentadong Pinoy. The program was supposedly a part of 5 Star Specials.

Plot
“Lady Dada” tells the story of hard luck Dindo (Ryan Agoncillo) who barely succeeds in every business and job he gets into. His star-crossed ventures eventually ruined his marriage with Rina (Mylene Dizon). After series of unfortunate events, he proves to be a bad luck magnet as he was restrained to get near his son Miko (Nathaniel Britt); this after he became violent in a bar owned by his wife and her ex-suitor Brian (Ryan Eigenmann).

Macario, his closeted high school best friend, enters the picture in literally gay fashion as Kylie (Keempee de Leon) on the rescue. He convinced Dindo to mask his identity as a pretty woman and audition to be the next drag queen in Rina's bar. In order to get closer to his wife and son, Dindo is left without a choice but to turn from a man to a woman to a drag queen! His woman pretense gets even awkward as she, err, he gets courted by Rina's widower brother Henry (Roderick Paulate).

Cast
Ryan Agoncillo as Dindo/Dada/Lady Dada
Roderick Paulate as Henry
Keempee de Leon as Macario/Kylie
Mylene Dizon as Rina
Ryan Eigenmann as Brian
Edgar Allan Guzman as Junior
Nathaniel Britt as Miko

See also
List of programs aired by TV5

References

Philippine drama television series
TV5 (Philippine TV network) original programming
2010 Philippine television series debuts
2010 Philippine television series endings
Filipino-language television shows